Goodbye Tiger is the fourth studio album by Australian rock music singer-songwriter, Richard Clapton. It was released in August 1977 via Infinity Records/Festival Records and was produced by Richard Batchens. It peaked at No. 11 on the Kent Music Report Albums Chart. In October 2010 it was listed at No. 15 in the book, 100 Best Australian Albums.

Background 

Australian singer-songwriter-guitarist, Richard Clapton, started writing tracks for his fourth studio album, Goodbye Tiger (August 1977), after he and a group of friends were at Sydney Town Hall to see American journalist, Hunter S. Thompson, in October 1976. Clapton was referred to as "Tiger" by "[his] 'beat poet' buddies." They got drunk and the binge continued until he got on a flight to Germany before crashing out at a friend's place in Frankfurt.

He wrote the title track at that friend's apartment and later recalled, "It was the only time I've ever written a song and then not gone back and changed a word. It seemed like it had been the end of our innocence or something." He was later snowed in at a resort in Denmark, where there was a blizzard and they were trapped, "but we had enough beer so it didn't really matter." It was there that he wrote most of Goodbye Tiger, which was released via Infinity Records/Festival Records with Richard Batchens producing. However it was the final album he recorded for Infinity Records and the last produced by Batchens.

Clapton's backing band for the album was: Gunther Gorman on guitar, Michael Hegerty on bass guitar (ex-Stars), Kirk Lorange on lead guitar, Diane McLennan on backing vocals, Cleis Pearce on viola (ex-MacKenzie Theory) and Greg Sheehan on drums (ex-Blackfeather, MacKenzie Theory). Additional musicians on some tracks included Tony Ansell on keyboards, Tony Buchanan on saxophone and Jim Penson on drums. Clapton has said that working on the album was the worst year of his life, "but I guess that's the record I will always be remembered for." During 1978 he toured nationally in support of its release with Ansell, Hegerty, Lorange, McLennan and Sheehan.

Reception 

Australian musicologist, Ian McFarlane, described Goodbye Tiger as, "his most celebrated work, an album full of rich, melodic and accessible rock with a distinctly Australian flavour. It established Clapton's reputation as one of the most important Australian songwriters of the 1970s." Australian rock music historian, Chris Spencer, explained why it is one of his favourites, "[It] represents one of the pinnacles of Australian rock music. Clapton, essentially a singer-songwriter, working within the security of numerous band line-ups, wrote his best lyrics on this album. He never reached the same heights again, particularly with his melodies, visions and observations of urban Australia."

In October 2010 it was listed at No. 15 in the book, 100 Best Australian Albums. The writers and music journalists, Toby Creswell, Craig Mathieson and John O'Donnell, described how, "Strangely, all the songs were about Australia..." despite being written while he was in Europe. They noticed that Clapton's work with Batchens, "was fraught with suspicion and hostility." While "The overriding mood of the album is edgy; like a hangover... All of the songs amplify the themes of the key songs 'Deep Water', 'Down in the Lucky Country' and the title song."

It reached No. 11 on the Kent Music Report Albums Chart in November 1977. It provided two singles, "Deep Water", which reached No. 43 on the Kent Music Report Singles Chart in November, and "Down in the Lucky Country", released in January 1978.

Track listing

Charts

Personnel 

Musicians

 Richard Clapton – vocals, guitar
 Tony Ansell – keyboards
 Tony Buchanan – saxophone (tracks 2, 7, 8)
 Dalvanius, Diane McLennan – backing vocals
 Gunther Gorman – bass guitar (tracks 2, 3, 4, 6, 7), lead guitar (track 2)
 Michael Hegerty – bass guitar
 Kirk Lorange – lead guitar
 Cleis Pearce – viola
 Jim Penson – drums (track 5)
 Greg Sheehan – drums, percussion

Technical and recording
 Producer – Richard Batchens at Festival Studios, Sydney
 Audio engineer – John Frolich, Batchens
 Artwork – Geoff Kleem
 Photography – Violette Hamilton

Release history

References 

1977 albums
Richard Clapton albums
Albums produced by Richard Batchens
Festival Records albums
Infinity Records albums